The 2014 Sydney Motorsport Park 400 was a motor race meeting for the Australian sedan-based V8 Supercars. It was the ninth event of the 2014 International V8 Supercars Championship. It was held on the weekend of 22–24 August at the Sydney Motorsport Park, near Sydney, New South Wales.

References 

Sydney Motorsport Park
August 2014 sports events in Australia